The 1980 AFC Asian Cup Final was a football match that took place on 30 September 1980, at the Sabah Al-Salem Stadium in Kuwait City, Kuwait, to determine the winner of the 1980 AFC Asian Cup. Kuwait defeated South Korea 3–0 with one goal from Al-Houti and two goals from Al-Dakhil, to win their first AFC Asian Cup.

Background
The 1980 AFC Asian Cup was the seventh edition of the AFC Asian Cup, the premier football competition of AFC. Qualification began on 25 December 1978 and ended in 14 May 1979, with Kuwait automatically qualified as hosts.

In the previous edition, South Korea did not qualify, being eliminated by Malaysia and Thailand; while Kuwait automatically qualified due to the withdrawal of four teams in Group 1. Kuwait then took part in the competition and reached the final, before agonisingly lost to Iran 0–1 by a goal from Ali Parvin. This meeting was the first time the two nations faced each other in the final of a continental championship, this were both Kuwait and South Korea's second appearance in an Asian Cup final, with both teams lost to Iran in the two previous finals. However, South Korea had won the tournament in the two first editions when the knockout format was yet issued.

Venue

The Sabah Al Salem Stadium, located in Kuwait City, Kuwait, hosted the 1980 AFC Asian Cup Final. The 15,000-seat stadium was built in 1977. It was only stadium used to host the 1980 Asian Cup; all matches were played in this stadium.

Route to the final

Match

Details

References

Finals
AFC Asian Cup Finals
Kuwait national football team matches
South Korea national football team matches
September 1980 sports events in Asia
Sport in Kuwait City
International association football competitions hosted by Kuwait